Michael Holody (born March 30, 1987) is a retired American soccer player.

Career

College and Amateur
Holody attended University of Michigan, where he made 75 appearance for the men’s soccer team, the Michigan Wolverines. During his college career, Holody played with USL Premier Development League side Michigan Bucks between 2006 and 2008. Holody's time with the Bucks was very successful as he helped the side to the 2006 PDL North American championship before captaining the team back to a finals appearance in 2007 and the PDL Regular Season title in 2008.

Professional
Holody was drafted in the fourth round, 59th overall, of the 2009 MLS SuperDraft by Colorado Rapids. He was sent on loan to USL-2 side Real Maryland Monarchs in July 2009, making his debut for them against Crystal Palace Baltimore.

He made his MLS debut on September 5, 2009 appearing as a substitute against Toronto FC. He scored his debut goal a week later on September 12, 2009 in another substitute appearance against Toronto. Holody was waived by Colorado on September 15, 2010.

Holody was re-signed by Colorado on March 1, 2011. At season's end, the club declined his 2012 contract option and he entered the 2011 MLS Re-Entry Draft. Holody was not selected in the draft and became a free agent.

Honors

Michigan Bucks
USL Premier Development League Champions (1): 2006

References

External links
 

1987 births
Living people
American soccer players
Association football defenders
Colorado Rapids draft picks
Colorado Rapids players
Major League Soccer players
Flint City Bucks players
Michigan Wolverines men's soccer players
People from Clarkston, Michigan
Real Maryland F.C. players
Soccer players from Michigan
USL League Two players
USL Second Division players